

Deaths
French naturalist Philippe-Isidore Picot de Lapeyrouse dies.

Species described

Charles Dumont de Sainte-Croix describes the saw-billed hermit.
Johann Gottlieb Fleischer describes the lesser kestrel.
Louis Jean Pierre Vieillot publishes the descriptions of dozens of bird species in the 1818 volumes of his landmark treatise Nouveau dictionnaire d'histoire naturelle, appliquée aux arts, à l'agriculture, à l'économie rurale et domestique, à la médecine.

Museums established or collections begun
The Natural History Museum of Prague is founded.
National Museum of Brazil is established.
Pierre-Médard Diard and  Alfred Duvaucel move to Chandannagar (Chandernagor in French), where they start a collection of animals and plants for the Paris Museum of Natural History.

Important publications
Johann Friedrich Naumann begins Die Eier der Vögel Deutschlands und der benachbarten Länder (The Eggs of Birds of Germany and Neighbouring Lands) with Christian Adam Buhle.
George Graves a comprehensive instruction guidebook for beginners in natural history The naturalist's pocket-book, or Tourist's companion : being a brief introduction to the different branches of natural history : with approved methods for collecting and preserving the various productions of nature

References

Birding and ornithology by year
1818 in science